Ivan Ivanovich Yudin (born 13 May 1990) is a Russian former professional football player.

Club career
On 7 June 2019, Russian Football Union banned him from football activity for three years after he allegedly accepted a bribe for ensuring that his team FC Chernomorets Novorossiysk loses to FC Chayka Peschanokopskoye.

References

External links
 

1990 births
People from Anapa
Living people
Russian footballers
Association football defenders
Association football midfielders
FC Armavir players
FC Krasnodar players
FC Chernomorets Novorossiysk players
Sportspeople from Krasnodar Krai